Kodjovi Albano "Nono" Koussou (born 22 June 1992) is a Togolese professional footballer who plays as a midfielder..

Career
Kousso is a youth exponent from 1860 Munich, who mainly played for the second team. After his contract was not extended in 2014 he signed with city rival Bayern Munich II. Only after a year, he left Bayern Munich II again. After one year without a club, he returned to 1860 Munich II again in 2016.

Personal life
He also holds German citizenship.

References

External links

1992 births
Living people
People from Lomé
Association football midfielders
Togolese footballers
2. Bundesliga players
3. Liga players
Regionalliga players
TSV 1860 Munich players
TSV 1860 Munich II players
FC Bayern Munich II players
SpVgg Bayreuth players
Togolese emigrants to Germany
Naturalized citizens of Germany
German people of Togolese descent